Yaovamalaya Narumala, Princess of Sawankhalok (4 June 1873–3 July 1909), was a Princess of Siam (later Thailand). She was a member of the Chakri dynasty of Thailand. She was the daughter of King Chulalongkorn.

Her mother was Ubolratana Narinaga, the Princess Akaravorarajgalya, daughter of Ladavalya, the Prince Bhumindrabhakdi and Mom Chin Ladavalya na Ayudhya. She was given full name by her father as Yaovamalaya Narumala Sabasakon Galyani

She served as an executive vice-president of the Red Unalom Society, a humanitarian organisation (later the Thai Red Cross Society), founded by Queen Savang Vadhana as maternal patron. Queen Saovabha Phongsri was appointed its first president, and Plien Phasakoravongs acted as the society secretary. She worked as an executive vice-president with the other princesses:

 Queen Sukhumala Marasri
 Suddha Dibyaratana, the Princess Sri Ratanakosindra
 Chandra Saradavara, the Princess of Phichit
 Srivilailaksana, the Princess of Suphan Buri
 Ubolratana Narinaka, the Princess Akaravorarajgalya
 Saisavalibhirom, the Princess Suddhasininat Piyamaharaj Padivaradda
 Chao Chom Manda Kesorn (Rama V)

On 21 May 1905, she was given the royal title from her father, that of Princess of Sawankhalok. She was given the rank of Krom Khun, the fourth level of the Krom ranks.

Princess Yaovamalaya Narumala died on 3 July 1909, at the age of 36.

Royal decorations
  Dame of The Most Illustrious Order of the Royal House of Chakri
  Dame Cross of the Most Illustrious Order of Chula Chom Klao (First class): received 26 November 1893

Ancestry

References
 Royal Command of giving title HRH Princess Yaovamalaya Narumala, the Princess of Sawankalok
 Executive Vice-President of Thai Red Cross Society

1873 births
1909 deaths
19th-century Thai women
19th-century Chakri dynasty
20th-century Thai women
20th-century Chakri dynasty
Thai female Chao Fa
Dames Grand Cross of the Order of Chula Chom Klao
Children of Chulalongkorn
Thai female Phra Ong Chao
Daughters of kings